Charles W. Bowser (November 29, 1898 – July 29, 1989) was an American football coach. He served as the head football coach at Grove City College from 1924 to 1926, at Bowdoin College from 1930 to 1934, and at the University of Pittsburgh from 1939 to 1942, compiling a career college football record of 40–47–6.

Early life
Bowser was born in Ligonier, Pennsylvania and attended Johnstown High School, where he played high school football. He left high school as a senior, in April 1918, in order to enlist in the Army. From May 1918 to April 1919, he served overseas in the Ambulance Corps.

In 1919, Bowser enrolled at the University of Pittsburgh. That season, he played on the freshman football team under freshman coach Andy Kerr. The following year, he joined the varsity team under head coach Pop Warner, and played at end, quarterback, tackle, and center. Bowser earned a varsity letter in 1922. He studied business administration and was a member of the Beta Gamma Sigma and Omicron Delta Kappa honor societies.

Coaching career
Upon graduation from Pittsburgh, Bowser served as an assistant at Grove City College under Guy "Chalky" Williamson. After the 1923 season, Williamson left for the Pittsburgh football staff, and Bowser took over as Grove City head coach. The Grove City Crimson went 3–5–1 in his first season, but improved in the next two years. In 1925, they posted a 7–1 record, with the sole loss coming against West Virginia. The next season, Grove City finished with a perfect 7–0 mark, including a 3–0 victory against Bo McMillin's Geneva College which defeated Harvard.

In 1927, Bowser returned to Pittsburgh, to aid head coach Jock Sutherland as the ends, backs, and centers mentor. In 1930, Bowser took over as the head coach of Bowdoin College, a post he held through 1934. He was replaced by Adam Walsh, former captain of the Notre Dame Fighting Irish. Bowser then became assistant at Pitt again in 1935, and in 1937, he was promoted to the chief assistant position.

After that season, he left the coaching ranks to work as an insurance agent in Pittsburgh. In 1939, Bowser returned to Pittsburgh as its head coach, and served in that position through the 1942 season. He resigned his post in January 1943 to take a commission in the United States Navy during World War II. He was replaced by T formation innovator Clark Shaughnessy.

Later life and death
Bowser resided in Royal Oak, Michigan during the last 13 years. He died of heart failure there on July 29, 1989.

Head coaching record

References

External links
 

1898 births
1989 deaths
American football centers
American football ends
American football quarterbacks
American football tackles
American businesspeople in insurance
Bowdoin Polar Bears football coaches
Grove City Wolverines football coaches
Pittsburgh Panthers football coaches
Pittsburgh Panthers football players
United States Army personnel of World War I
United States Army personnel of World War II
United States Army soldiers
United States Navy officers
People from Westmoreland County, Pennsylvania
Coaches of American football from Pennsylvania
Players of American football from Pennsylvania
Military personnel from Pennsylvania